This is a list of governors for Västmanland County of Sweden, from 1634 to present.

Footnotes

References

Vastmanland